Alone in the Dark is a 1992 survival horror video game designed by Frédérick Raynal and developed and published by Infogrames for the PC. Alone in the Dark was released for MS-DOS in 1992, ported for the 3DO by Krisalis in 1994, and ported for iOS by Atari in 2014. Set in 1920s Louisiana, the game challenges the player to guide the player character out of a haunted mansion, advancing by solving puzzles while either banishing, slaying, or eluding various ghosts and monsters. The player can collect and use weapons, manage a weight-based inventory system, and explore a partially nonlinear map.

Alone in the Dark received critical acclaim upon its release, and is considered a breakthrough and influential title, as it was the first 3D survival horror game. In the years since its release, many commentators have dropped the 3D qualifier and asserted that Alone in the Dark was the first survival horror game regardless of graphical perspective. Among the accolades that followed its release, Alone in the Dark received the European Computer Trade Show awards for Best Graphics and Most Original Game in 1993. In 2009, Empire included Alone in the Dark on their list of 100 greatest video games of all time.

Alone in the Dark is considered a forefather, and often the originator, of the survival horror genre and it strongly influenced Shinji Mikami's direction of the original Resident Evil game, as well as the franchise as a whole. Alone in the Dark has also spawned four follow-up games as part of the series, as well as two films loosely based on them.

Atari sold the IP to THQ Nordic in 2018. Subsequently a reimagining of the 1992 game was announced in August 2022 at THQ Nordics digital showcase.

Gameplay

Players choose between a male or female protagonist (Edward Carnby or Emily Hartwood, respectively), and are then trapped inside the haunted mansion of Derceto. The player character starts in the attic, having ascended to the top of the mansion without incident, and is tasked with finding a way out of the mansion while avoiding, outsmarting or defeating various supernatural enemies including slave zombies and giant bipedal rat-like creatures. Though able to kill most enemies with simply fists and feet, the player character can also find and utilize various weapons.

Many opponents can be beaten by solving a particular puzzle rather than a straight fight—indeed, a significant number of opponents cannot be killed at all. Much of the game involves exploration and puzzle-solving, and optionally searching the house for clues as to what occurred before the player's arrival.

The player character can search any area, open and close doors, push certain objects, and pick up some items. Items in inventory can be used, opened, read, thrown, or put down, though not all of these options are offered for every item. Inventory is highly limited, and the player must often discard items to make room. It is possible to discard items that are needed to complete the game, but discarded items remain in play and can be retrieved later, even if the player character leaves the room. Available space in inventory is determined by weight, not number of items; for example, a player may discard a book and two knives yet still not be able to pick up the heavy statuette.

Unlike its sequels, and much of the survival horror genre, the game is partially non-linear. The player character is initially restricted to the attic and third floor, whose rooms are arranged such that they must be traversed in a linear order. Completing the puzzle at the end of the third floor grants the player character access to the first and second floors. The player can explore the rooms in this area in any order, and can also revisit the attic and third floor if desired. Upon completing a specific puzzle, the player gains access to the caverns beneath the mansion. The caverns are completely linear, and each challenge must be overcome as it is encountered.

Plot
In 1924, Jeremy Hartwood, a noted artist and owner of the Louisiana mansion Derceto (named after the Syrian deity), has died by suicide by hanging himself. His death appears suspicious yet seems to surprise nobody, for Derceto is widely reputed to be haunted by an evil power. The case is quickly dealt with by the police and soon forgotten by the public. The player assumes the role of either Edward Carnby—a private investigator who is sent to find a piano in the loft for an antique dealer—or Emily Hartwood, Jeremy's niece, who is also interested in finding the piano because she believes a secret drawer in it has a note in which Jeremy explains his suicide. Whether Carnby or Hartwood, the character goes to the mansion to investigate.

Upon entering the house, the doors mysteriously slam shut behind the player character. He or she continues up to the attic, but is attacked by monsters. The player character progresses back down through the house, fighting off various creatures and hazards. The player character finds documents throughout the house indicating that Derceto was built by an occultist pirate named Ezechiel Pregzt, and that beneath the house are caverns that were used for dark rituals meant to increase Pregzt's fortunes and unnaturally extend his life. Pregzt was shot and Derceto was burned down by encamped Union soldiers during the American Civil War. However, Pregzt's spirit lived on, and his corpse was placed by his servants in an old tree in the caverns underneath Derceto. Jeremy Hartwood committed suicide to prevent his body being used as a host for Pregzt, so Pregzt now focuses on the player character. If the player character is incapacitated, their body is subsequently dragged to a sacrificial area and possessed by Pregzt, whereupon the game ends with an image of supernatural horrors being unleashed from the house into the world at large.

The player character finds a passage into the caverns in Hartwood's study, and makes his or her way to the tree where Pregzt resides. The player character hurls a lighted lantern at the tree, then flees the collapsing cavern. Pregzt is consumed by the flames, and the house is purged of supernatural creatures and other effects caused by his influence. The player can finally open the front doors and leave the house, which is now completely safe to explore (except for physical hazards such as falling to one's death through chasms or rotten floorboards, and two magical books in the library which remain lethal to read). The driver is outside to take the character home, but is revealed to be a zombie. The zombie drives the car back to civilization.

The story is heavily influenced by the works of Edgar Allan Poe and H. P. Lovecraft. The setting for the story is inspired by Poe's "The Fall of the House of Usher". Grimoires found in the mansion's library include the Necronomicon and De Vermis Mysteriis, both taken from Lovecraft's Cthulhu Mythos. Other Mythos references include books that feature the narrated history of Lord Boleskine, a direct reference to another Infogrames Cthulhu Mythos-based game, Shadow of the Comet, and the last name of player character Edward Carnby, a reference to John Carnby, a character in the mythos tale The Return of the Sorcerer by Clark Ashton Smith. Several of the supernatural opponents are recognizable creatures from the Mythos, including Deep Ones, Nightgaunts and a Chthonian.

Development and release
In 1989, Frédérick Raynal, a staff programmer at Infogrames, was assigned to port the early 3D game Alpha Waves. Working on the game inspired him to begin programming a tool for the creation and animation of 3D characters, with help from Franck De Girolami. In 1991, Infogrames CEO Bruno Bonnell proposed a game in which the player would use matches to gain snapshot views of an otherwise completely dark environment. An aficionado of horror films such as Dawn of the Dead, Raynal saw in this proposal the opportunity to create a horror-based game, and was given permission to lead the project.

The game's working titles included In the Dark and Scream in the Dark (or Screams in the Dark). Following Raynal's basic vision for the game, Infogrames artistic director Didier Chanfray rendered a series of concept sketches using white chalk on black Canson paper. These sketches were used for an internal contest to pick the game's graphic artist, Yaël Barroz. By this time Raynal already had decided that the game would make use of text to convey the backstory, as he felt computer graphics at the time were not advanced enough to be frightening on their own. He had also determined the game's setting: 

Initially he planned to create the game's backgrounds using scanned photos of an actual mansion built in the 1920s, but this idea proved too ambitious for the 3D rendering tools available, and the team had to use hand-drawn bitmaps instead. Items and characters in Alone in the Dark are three-dimensional, rendered upon a two-dimensional fixed background. Mixing polygons and 2D prerendered background images required a fixed camera angle, which designers used to their advantage to create dramatic scene setups appropriate for a horror-themed game. In September 1991, the team of Raynal, Chanfray, and Barroz presented an early playable version of Alone in the Dark - containing only a couple rooms - to Infogrames, who then green-lighted production of the game. The development team was expanded to include Franck De Girolami (programmer), Philippe Vachey (composer), Hubert Chardot (writer), and Franck Manzetti (designer).

The game briefly acquired the Call of Cthulhu role-playing game license, but was ultimately denied it when Chaosium determined that the game was too simple to do justice to the rules of the pen-and-paper game. The character Emily Hartwood was added because the conventional wisdom of the time was that a game would appeal to more female gamers if it had a female playable character. To maximize the player's anxiety and fear, the game was designed so that even such mundane actions as walking down a hall, opening a door, and reading a book could cause the player character to die. Though such deaths would only occur in select places, they would make the player feel unnerved whenever taking such actions.

During the game's production, Raynal and Barroz became romantically involved and conceived a child. Most of the production was marked with a spirit of optimism and creative enthusiasm, but the bug-testing phase wore out the team, especially Raynal. By the time it was released, he felt dissatisfied with almost every aspect of Alone in the Dark and felt certain that all of its flaws would be noticed by players.

Alternate versions, ports and remakes
Outside of Europe, Alone in the Dark was distributed in North America by Interplay Entertainment and in Japan by Arrow Micro-Techs Corp, which developed and published Japanese-exclusive versions for the PC-98 and FM Towns computers. The game was also ported to the 3DO by Krisalis in 1994. This version is largely identical to the original, but uses the orchestrated version of the original soundtrack and the voice acting to the character intros and documents that had already been introduced to the PC CD-ROM re-release of the game. This version was also published in Japan by Pony Canyon. An Atari Jaguar CD port was also in development by Infogrames but it was never released. A 32X version was also planned but never released.

In 2012, when asked for a possible high-definition remake of Alone in the Dark, Raynal said he loved the idea but no attempts have been made yet as he no longer holds the rights to the franchise. There was an attempt to remake the game by Eden Games but after the release of the 2008 Alone In The Dark, which received lukewarm reception, parent company Atari laid off most of the employees and ultimately cancelled the game. Screenshots and gameplay footage of the prototype came out soon afterward.

In 2014, Atari released an official port for iOS, co-developed by Kung Fu Factory. It received mixed to poor reviews as it was a direct port with no proper enhancements to make it playable with touch screen controls. Since 2022, the port has not been updated, making it unplayable for modern operating systems.

In August 2022, an announcement was made that a reboot of 1992 original was in development. THQ Nordic, the new owner of the Alone In The Dark franchise, will publish and develop the game for the PC, PlayStation 5, and Xbox Series X/S. It features the same 2 protagonists in the same setting but with a completely new story written by Mikael Hedberg, former Frictional Games writer who had worked on Penumbra: Black Plague, Amnesia: The Dark Descent, and SOMA.

Reception

By February 1997, Alone in the Dark had sold 600,000 copies. According to the French newspaper Libération, it sold 2.5 million units by January 2000.

Alone in the Dark was met with great critical acclaim. Jacob Blackford of Computer Shopper applauded the game's atmospheric design and its use of fixed camera angles, which provided the player with a "movie-like" experience. Blackford ultimately concluded that Alone in the Dark is "fast-paced, well-designed fun", and while "the game isn't difficult to solve, the real thrill is in the playing". Computer Gaming Worlds Charles Ardai praised the game, citing its multiple viewpoints and stating that no previous game had caused him to "jump in fright at the slightest sound .. I feel that I have been inside a real house". He described the game as "truly a diabolical simulation, rich in evil imaginings and unexpected twists". In the same issue Scorpia was more critical, citing issues such as books that killed without warning when read. She stated that "Alone in the Dark is one of those neat games with some irritating flaws. It sets a good atmosphere ... Using Lovecraftian overtones adds a lot ... The view shifts are a novel and effective addition", and concluded that it "is a nice change of pace from the usual run of adventure games". In 1994 the magazine said that "The floppy-based version was simply the best horror game for the computer in years", and that the CD version "offers better animation and more eerie sounds".

Reviewing the 3DO version, GamePro described it as "a clunky, semirealistic game", citing restrictively linear game design, an overly slow-moving player character, and "silly-looking, quirky-moving monsters", though they did praise the moody sound effects and 3D camera angles. In contrast, Electronic Gaming Monthly commented "A faithful translation of the PC title, this game has excellent graphics and sound ... for fans of more deliberate game play, this is the one to get." Next Generation reviewed the 3DO version of the game, and stated that "Alone'''s subtle mix of eerie music, grim animation sequences, and suspense-filled storyline create an atmosphere of tense horror that adds an interesting new twist to the standard graphic adventure."

A review for the Macintosh version in Next Generation stated that "Eerie, flowing movement and less-is-more polygonal simplicity make this Lovecraft-inspired game all the more creepy." Praising the game's sound effects, balance of action with more cerebral gameplay, and mood-setting camera angles, the reviewer dubbed it "A breakthrough game".Alone in the Dark won many prestigious gaming industry awards, including the European Computer Trade Show 1993 awards for Best Graphics, Most Original Game and Best French Game of the year, and the Consumer Electronics Show 1993 award for Best Foreign Game. In 1994, PC Gamer US named Alone in the Dark the 10th best computer game ever. The editors called it "without a doubt, one of the most unique and exciting games ever." That same year, PC Gamer UK named it the 31st best computer game of all time, calling it "a classic title." In 1996, Computer Gaming World ranked Alone in the Dark as the 88th best video game of all time, adding that it "showed that 3D action needn't get in the way of a tense, exciting story", also listing the game's Game Over cutscene among the 15 "best ways to die in computer gaming". In 1998, PC Gamer declared it the 22nd-best computer game ever released, and the editors called it "the high-point of the series thanks to its spine-tingling storyline and creepy monsters". In 2005, Game Informer put it on their list of top 25 most influential video games of all time. In 2009, Empire included Alone in the Dark on their list of 100 greatest video games of all time for its "ingenious approach coming closer than any game had before to photo-realism, and inspiring other developers to experiment with fresh approaches to presentation."

LegacyAlone in the Dark was supposed to be the first part of Infogrames' Call of Cthulhu series, and later of the Virtual Dreams series (the original French cover included the Virtual Dreams logo), but ended up starting its own franchise. The game was followed by five more games in the series: Alone in the Dark 2 (1993), Alone in the Dark 3 (1994), Alone in the Dark: The New Nightmare (2001), Alone in the Dark (2008) and Alone in the Dark: Illumination (2015), and inspired two live-action films Alone in the Dark and Alone in the Dark II. It is widely considered to be a forefather of the survival horror game genre, setting the standard for later rival popular survival horror games such as Resident Evil and Silent Hill''.

Notes

References

External links

1992 video games
3DO Interactive Multiplayer games
Acorn Archimedes games
Alone in the Dark
Cancelled Atari Jaguar games
Cancelled Sega 32X games
Classic Mac OS games
Cthulhu Mythos video games
DOS games
FM Towns games
Games commercially released with DOSBox
Golden Joystick Award winners
1990s horror video games
Infogrames games
IOS games
Krisalis Software games
NEC PC-9801 games
Single-player video games
Video games about zombies
Video games developed in France
Video games featuring female protagonists
Video games set in 1924
Video games set in Louisiana
Video games with pre-rendered 3D graphics
Works set in country houses
Kung Fu Factory games